Elaphrus aureus is a species of ground beetle in the subfamily Elaphrinae. It was described by P.W.J. Muller in 1821.

References

Elaphrinae
Beetles described in 1821